May 12 - Eastern Orthodox Church calendar - May 14

All fixed commemorations below celebrated on May 26 by Orthodox Churches on the Old Calendar.

For May 13th, Orthodox Churches on the Old Calendar commemorate the Saints listed on April 30.

Saints
 Virgin-martyr Glyceria at Heraclea, Propontis (c. 138-161)
 Martyr Laodicius, jailer of Saint Glyceria (c. 138-161)
 Saint Theoctistus, monk from Tekoa, Palestine 
 Saint Pausicacus, Bishop of Synnada (606)
 Saint Nicephoros, Presbyter of the monastery of Ephapsios 
 Saint Sergius (George) the Confessor of Constantinople, with his wife Irene and children (c. 829-842)
 Saint Euthymius the New (the Illuminator) (1028), founder of Iveron Monastery, and his fellow Georgian saints of Mount Athos: 
 His father monk-martyr John of Iveron (998); his cousin monk-martyr George of Iveron (1065); and monk-martyr Gabriel of Iveron (10th century)

Pre-Schism Western saints
 Saint Abban of Ireland, baptized in 165 AD, missionary in Abingdon, Oxfordshire (2nd century)
 Martyr Alexander of Rome (284-305)
 Saint Valerian of Auxerre, third Bishop of Auxerre in France, and defender of Orthodoxy against Arianism. (350)
 Saint Onesimus of Gaul, fifth Bishop of Soissons in France (361)
 Saint Servatius, Bishop of Tongres, defender against Arianism in the Netherlands (384)
 Saint Agnes of Poitiers, chosen by St. Radegund to be Abbess of Holy Cross at Poitiers in France (588) 
 Saint Mael (Mahel), Ascetic on the Isle of Bardsey (6th century)
 Saint Natalis (Natale), Bishop of Milan in Italy (751)
 Saint Anno (Hanno, Annon), Bishop of Verona in Italy (780)
 Saint Merwenna of Rumsey (Merwinna, Merewenna), first Abbess of Rumsey convent, in Hampshire (c. 970) 
 Blessed Fortis Gabrielli, Ascetic (1040)

Post-Schism Orthodox saints
 Venerable monk-martyrs of Iveron Monastery, martyred by the Latins (c. 1259-1280) 
 Repose of Saint Macarius, Abbot of Glushitsa Monastery, Vologda (1480) 
 Righteous Virgin Glyceria of Novgorod (1522)

New martyrs and confessors
 Hieromartyrs Basil Sokolov, Alexander Zaozersky, and Christopher Nadezhdin (1922)
 Hieromartyr Macarius Telegin, and Martyr Sergius Tikhomirov (1922)
 103 New Hieromartyrs of Cherkasy (20th century)

Other commemorations
 Consecration of the Monastery of Panagia Pantanassa (Most-Holy Queen of All), on the small island of Hagia Glykeria (Incirli Adasi) in the Bay of Tuzla (12th century)
 Translation of the relics (1688) of Hieromartyr Saint Macarius, Archimandrite of Ovruch and Pinsk, from Kaniv to Pereyaslavl (1678) 
 Repose of righteous Priest Alexis of Bortsurmany, disciple of St. Seraphim of Sarov (1848)
 Repose of Rassophore Monk John, of St. Nilus of Sora Monastery (1863)
 Repose of Eldress Sepfora of Klykovo (1997)

Icon gallery

Notes

References

Sources
 May 13. OCA - The Lives of the Saints.
 May 13/26. Orthodox Calendar (PRAVOSLAVIE.RU).
 May 26 / May 13. HOLY TRINITY RUSSIAN ORTHODOX CHURCH (A parish of the Patriarchate of Moscow).
 Complete List of Saints. Protection of the Mother of God Church (POMOG).
 May. Self-Ruled Antiochian Orthodox Christian Archdiocese of North America. 
 Dr. Alexander Roman. May. Calendar of Ukrainian Orthodox Saints (Ukrainian Orthodoxy - Українське Православ'я).
 May 13. Latin Saints of the Orthodox Patriarchate of Rome.
 May 13. The Roman Martyrology.
Greek Sources
 Great Synaxaristes:  13 ΜΑΪΟΥ. ΜΕΓΑΣ ΣΥΝΑΞΑΡΙΣΤΗΣ.
  Συναξαριστής. 13 Μαΐου. ECCLESIA.GR. (H ΕΚΚΛΗΣΙΑ ΤΗΣ ΕΛΛΑΔΟΣ). 
Russian Sources
  26 мая (13 мая). Православная Энциклопедия под редакцией Патриарха Московского и всея Руси Кирилла (электронная версия). (Orthodox Encyclopedia - Pravenc.ru).
  13 мая (ст.ст.) 26 мая 2013 (нов. ст.). Русская Православная Церковь Отдел внешних церковных связей. (DECR).

May in the Eastern Orthodox calendar